Time Quest may refer to:
Hype: The Time Quest, a computer game
Time Travel Tondekeman, a science-fiction anime known as Time Quest outside Japan